Mott insulators are a class of materials that are expected to conduct electricity according to conventional band theories, but turn out to be insulators (particularly at low temperatures). These insulators fail to be correctly described by band theories of solids due to their strong electron–electron interactions, which are not considered in conventional band theory. A Mott transition is a transition from a metal to an insulator, driven by the strong interactions between electrons. One of the simplest models that can capture Mott transition is the Hubbard model.

The band gap in a Mott insulator exists between bands of like character, such as 3d electron bands, whereas the band gap in charge-transfer insulators exists between anion and cation states, such as between O 2p and Ni 3d bands in NiO.

History
Although the band theory of solids had been very successful in describing various electrical properties of materials, in 1937 Jan Hendrik de Boer and Evert Johannes Willem Verwey pointed out that a variety of transition metal oxides predicted to be conductors by band theory are insulators. With an odd number of electrons per unit cell, the valence band is only partially filled, so the Fermi level lies within the band. From the band theory, this implies that such a material has to be a metal. This conclusion fails for several cases, e.g. CoO, one of the strongest insulators known.

Nevill Mott and Rudolf Peierls also in 1937 predicted the failing of band theory can be explained by including interactions between electrons.

In 1949, in particular, Mott proposed a model for NiO as an insulator, where conduction is based on the formula

(Ni2+O2−)2 → Ni3+O2− + Ni1+O2−.

In this situation, the formation of an energy gap preventing conduction can be understood as the competition between the Coulomb potential U between 3d electrons and the transfer integral t of 3d electrons between neighboring atoms (the transfer integral is a part of the tight binding approximation). The total energy gap is then

Egap = U − 2zt,

where z is the number of nearest-neighbor atoms.

In general, Mott insulators occur when the repulsive Coulomb potential U is large enough to create an energy gap. One of the simplest theories of Mott insulators is the 1963 Hubbard model. The crossover from a metal to a Mott insulator as U is increased, can be predicted within the so-called dynamical mean field theory.

Mottness
Mottism denotes the additional ingredient, aside from antiferromagnetic ordering, which is necessary to fully describe a Mott insulator. In other words, we might write: antiferromagnetic order + mottism = Mott insulator.

Thus, mottism accounts for all of the properties of Mott insulators that cannot be attributed simply to antiferromagnetism.

There are a number of properties of Mott insulators, derived from both experimental and theoretical observations, which cannot be attributed to antiferromagnetic ordering and thus constitute mottism. These properties include:

Spectral weight transfer on the Mott scale
Vanishing of the single particle Green function along a connected surface in momentum space in the first Brillouin zone
The presence of a charge  (with  the charge of an electron) boson at low energies
A pseudogap away from half-filling

Applications

Mott insulators are of growing interest in advanced physics research, and are not yet fully understood. They have applications in thin-film magnetic heterostructures and the strong correlated phenomena in high-temperature superconductivity, for example.

This kind of insulator can become a conductor by changing some parameters, which may be composition, pressure, strain, voltage, or magnetic field. The effect is known as a Mott transition and can be used to build smaller field-effect transistors, switches and memory devices than possible with conventional materials.

See also

 
 
 
 
 
 
  (Mott)

Notes

References

Correlated electrons
Quantum phases